Bahn may refer to:
Banie, formerly named Bahn, a Polish village
Deutsche Bahn, the national German railway company
Paul Bahn, British archaeologist

See also
Banie (disambiguation)